Mark Rutte (born 1967) is the Prime Minister of the Netherlands.

Rutte may also refer to:
 Rutte (surname), a Dutch surname (including a list of people)
 Rutte, Tarvisio, an Italian parish
 Rutte, a Holland gin

See also 
 Rutten (disambiguation)